Timothy Frank Morehouse (born July 29, 1978) is an American fencer who won a Silver Medal competing in the men's sabre as a member of the United States fencing team at the 2008 Summer Olympics in Beijing. Morehouse is coached by Yury Gelman. He is the founder of the Fencing in the Schools program.

Early life
Morehouse is the son of Eloise and John Morehouse. He grew up in the Riverdale section of the Bronx in New York City. He originally took up fencing at Riverdale Country School in order to be excused from gym class. In high school, he played on the Riverdale Country School's baseball team all four years and was a member of the cross country running team for one year. He was the fencing team's captain and most valuable player during his junior and senior years at the school.

Higher education
Morehouse received a bachelor's degree from Brandeis University in 2000, majoring in History. He was awarded a master's degree in Teaching from Pace University in 2003.

Religious and ethnic heritage
His maternal grandmother was a Jewish immigrant who escaped Nazi Germany in the 1930s; she later joined the Quakers. Morehouse was raised with a "mixture" of religious traditions. He spoke in an interview before the 2012 Olympics about how his "sense of being Jewish" is based on the experiences of his maternal grandmother, and that he planned to participate in the 2013 Maccabiah Games, an international Jewish athletic event held in Israel every four years.

Fencing career
Morehouse won a Silver Medal competing in the men's sabre as a member of the United States fencing team, at the 2008 Summer Olympics in Beijing. He is a two-time individual U.S. National Champion (2010 and 2011) and was the number-one-ranked U.S. men's sabre fencer from 2008 to 2011. He trained with Yury Gelman at the Manhattan Fencing Center, and at Bodhizone Human Performance and Sports Physical Therapy in New York City.

College
Morehouse attended Brandeis University, where he was ranked in the top 10 of the NCAA's Division I men's sabre in each of his final three years at the school (ranked tenth in 1998, sixth in 1999 and fourth in 2000). He was honored as an NCAA All-American in each of those years. He was voted by coaches and athletes as NCAA men's sabre fencer of the year in 2000. Morehouse led Brandeis to be ranked tenth among all Division I schools in 2000.

Olympics
Morehouse was a member of the U. S. Olympic team in 2004, 2008, and 2012.
Morehouse was selected as a reserve on the U.S. Fencing Team at the 2004 Summer Olympics in Athens, after mounting a comeback and defeating Ahmed Yilla at the U.S. Fencing National Championship in Atlanta, where he competed as part of Fencers Club. As a replacement, Morehouse was ineligible for individual competition but could participate as a substitute in team competition. Morehouse was ranked 16th in the world in 2007.

Morehouse competed in men's team sabre at the 2008 Summer Olympics in Beijing, and won the Silver Medal.

In the 2012 London Olympic Games, he competed in both the team and individual events.  In individual men's saber, he lost in the quarterfinals to Diego Occhiuzzi of Italy, who went on to win silver. In the men's team sabre event Morehouse was one of two fencers from the Beijing Olympics still on the team, the other being James Williams. The team eventually came in 8th.

Service and philanthropy
After graduating from college, Morehouse taught underprivileged students while working with Teach For America, teaching 7th grade at Intermediate School 90 in Washington Heights, Manhattan while he coached the fencing team at his alma mater, Riverdale Country School. He has worked at the organization's offices in New York City while he trained for the Olympics. In 2010 Fast Company named him one of the most influential alumni of Teach For America.

He also supports various non-profits and is an Athlete Ambassador for Right to Play, an organization working with volunteers and partners to use sport and play to enhance child development in areas of disadvantage. In 2011, Morehouse founded Fencing in the Schools – a non-profit program dedicated to bringing the sport of fencing to under-served communities throughout the country.

Fencing outreach and development

After the 2008 Olympics, Morehouse worked to promote the sport of fencing and established programs to attract new participants to the sport. As a motivational speaker, Morehouse spoke to over 15,000 children and young people in urban schools about his Olympic story. He has also given presentations to Fortune 100 and 500 organizations. One of the highlights of his career took place in 2009 when he taught President Obama to fence on the White House lawn in support of Chicago's bid to host the 2016 Summer Olympics. He has appeared on the Today Show and Happy Hour on Fox Business. In 2008, he was one of the featured athletes on the Emmy Award-winning television documentary, "My First Time: The Summer Games" directed and produced by  Jesse Zook Mann.

In 2015, Morehouse founded the Morehouse Fencing Club) in New York, NY. It opened October 12.  The club has saber, foil, and épée programs. The club specializes in beginner fencers, both youth and adult. It also offers advanced classes for competitive sabre fencers. The classes are arranged by age and skill level. Morehouse hopes his club will
create interest in the sport of fencing. As of right now, Tim Morehouse is the
owner and head coach of the club. Melvin Rodriguez is also a coach at the club
and Yitzy Frankel is the Club Manager. He believes the sport will bring
benefits to more people around the United States, especially the youth.  He has had a few celebrities stop by, such as
Project Runway's Tim Gunn, as well as NFL Star Steve Weatherford filming at
the location for an episode of Spike TV's Playbook 360.

Currently,
Morehouse is attempting to improve the sport of fencing. One project he is
working on new technology. On his Facebook page, he posted a video of him and
another fencer demonstrating light up sabres. The lights are on the guard as
well as on the wrist of the fencer. The problem Morehouse is trying to fix is
for people watching the bout. They watch the fencers, then the scoring box, and
then look at the director to see who made the touch. With this technology, it
will be easier to see who got the touch. It will also be easier on the director,
since the director can now focus on the fencers, rather than having to look
back at the box to see the lights.

He
has made a prototype for foil as well, in hopes of having the sport to be
wire-free, without wire jackets, as well as having as much of the technology of
the weapons. For the foils, each weapon would have the lights, the lockout
timing, and the ability to send data on the movements of the weapon. This data
will include who is starting first and the accuracy of attacks. In the video, he shows that the weapons sync up wirelessly, and the jackets they are wearing have a magnetic layer underneath. When hit, there is a sound and the foil lights up green.

Morehouse
has also suggested new rules to sabre, making it more like tennis. One fencer would have priority and, after a "set" of four points, the priority is shifted
to another fencer. The bouts would then go to 16, instead of 15, with a 2-point margin.

Writing and awards
He is the author of an autobiography, American Fencer: Modern Lessons from an Ancient Sport (2012), in which he recounts experiences as an Olympic athlete and teacher.

Morehouse was inducted into Brandeis Athletics Hall of Fame in 2009, and was the youngest recipient of Brandeis University's Alumni Achievement Award in 2010  for his achievements as an athlete and his work with Teach For America.

In November 2014, Morehouse received the Athletes in Excellence Award from The Foundation for Global Sports Development, in recognition of his community service efforts and work with youth.

See also

List of select Jewish fencers
 World Fit

References

External links
Tim Morehouse website
 Fencing Masters website
 Tim Morehouse NYC Fencing Club

Living people
1978 births
American male sabre fencers
Brandeis University alumni
Fencers at the 2008 Summer Olympics
Fencers at the 2012 Summer Olympics
Fencers at the 2011 Pan American Games
Jewish male sabre fencers
Jewish American sportspeople
Olympic silver medalists for the United States in fencing
Pace University alumni
People from Riverdale, Bronx
Medalists at the 2008 Summer Olympics
Pan American Games medalists in fencing
Pan American Games gold medalists for the United States
Pan American Games silver medalists for the United States
Teach For America alumni
Educators from New York City
Riverdale Country School alumni
Medalists at the 2011 Pan American Games